Raffaele Zovenzoni (1431 – circa 1484) was an Italian humanist and writer. 

He was born in Trieste, and received his early education. He then studied law at Padua. He studied under Guarino da Verona, and thereafter taught in Capo d'Istria (now Koper), where he was patronized by the proveditore of Venice, Marcello.The Politics of Culture in Quattrocento Europe: René of Anjou in Italy, by Oren Margolis (2016), page 105. He also lived in Trieste ( 1466-1470). He was prompted by Johannes Hinderbach, Prince-Bishop of Trent, to write an antisemitic hymn about Simon of Trent.

References

Italian Renaissance humanists
15th-century Italian writers
1431 births
1484 deaths